Kvemo-Achabeti is a settlement in the Tskhinvali district of South Ossetia.

See also
 Tskhinvali District

Notes

References 

Populated places in Tskhinvali District